The Prix Iris for Best Short Documentary is an annual award, presented by Québec Cinéma as part of its Prix Iris program, to honour the best short documentary films made in the Cinema of Quebec. The award was presented for the first time at the 23rd Quebec Cinema Awards in 2021.

2020s

See also
Canadian Screen Award for Best Short Documentary

References

Awards established in 2021
Short documentary
Quebec-related lists
Canadian documentary film awards